Marián Had (born 16 September 1982) is a Slovak former professional footballer who played mainly as a left back but also as a central defender.

Football career
Born in Dolný Kubín, Slovakia, Czechoslovakia, Had started his professional career in MFK Ružomberok, where he became an emergent fixture in the Slovak Super Liga. In the 2004 summer, he was sold to 1. FC Brno in the neighbouring Czech Republic for €20.000.

After two seasons, Had's first foreign adventure arrived, with a transfer to FC Lokomotiv Moscow for €2 million. There, he found himself more than often injured (knee, brain concussion, broken jawbone and cheekbone).

For the 2007–08 campaign, Had joined Sporting Clube de Portugal on loan, to replace departed Rodrigo Tello and Marco Caneira. He was initially the second-choice left-back behind Ronny and, with Leandro Grimi's arrival in January 2008 on loan from A.C. Milan, he was deemed surplus to requirements by manager Paulo Bento, subsequently returning to Lokomotiv in February.

Had was again loaned in 2008–09, now to AC Sparta Prague. In January 2010, he was definitely released and signed with ŠK Slovan Bratislava.

Honours
Győr
Nemzeti Bajnokság I: 2012–13

References

External links
 
 
 
 

1982 births
Living people
People from Dolný Kubín
Sportspeople from the Žilina Region
Slovak footballers
Association football defenders
Slovak Super Liga players
MFK Ružomberok players
ŠK Slovan Bratislava players
FC DAC 1904 Dunajská Streda players
FK Dukla Banská Bystrica players
FC Petržalka players
Czech First League players
FC Zbrojovka Brno players
AC Sparta Prague players
Russian Premier League players
FC Lokomotiv Moscow players
Primeira Liga players
Sporting CP footballers
Nemzeti Bajnokság I players
Győri ETO FC players
Slovakia international footballers
Slovak expatriate footballers
Expatriate footballers in the Czech Republic
Expatriate footballers in Russia
Expatriate footballers in Portugal
Expatriate footballers in Hungary
Slovak expatriate sportspeople in the Czech Republic
Slovak expatriate sportspeople in Russia
Slovak expatriate sportspeople in Portugal
Slovak expatriate sportspeople in Hungary